Grecian Rocks is a coral reef located within the Florida Keys National Marine Sanctuary. It lies to the east of Key Largo, within the Key Largo Existing Management Area, which is immediately to the east of John Pennekamp Coral Reef State Park. This reef is within a Sanctuary Preservation Area (SPA).

Grecian Rocks are south of Dry Rocks, a smaller reef.

External links
 Benthic Habitat Map

References
 NOAA National Marine Sanctuary Maps, Florida Keys East
 NOAA website on Grecian Rocks
 NOAA Navigational Chart 11464

Coral reefs of the Florida Keys